Ținutul Timiș was one of the ten Romanian ținuturi ("lands"), founded in 1938 after King Carol II initiated an institutional reform by modifying the 1923 Constitution and the law of territorial administration. It comprised the Romanian Banat and parts of Transylvania, and was named after the Timiș River; its capital was the city of Timișoara. Ținutul Timiș ceased to exist following the territorial losses of Romania to the Axis powers and the king's abdication in 1940.

Coat of arms
The coat of arms consists of five bars, three of gules and two of azure, representing the former five counties (județe) of Greater Romania (of the total 71) that were included in the ținut. Over the bars is a sable raven facing dexter, holding in its beak a sable ring, recalling a legend regarding John Hunyadi's son and his mother's ring (events linked to the city of Hunedoara).

Former counties incorporated
After the 1938 Administrative and Constitutional Reform, the older 71 counties lost their authority. 
 Arad County
 Caraș County
 Hunedoara County
 Severin County
 Timiș-Torontal County

See also
 Historical administrative divisions of Romania
 Vest (development region)
 Banat
 History of Transylvania
 History of Romania

External links
 1939 Map of Romania

History of Banat
Timis
20th century in Transylvania
1938 establishments in Romania
1940 disestablishments in Romania
States and territories established in 1938
States and territories disestablished in 1940